Don Hay (born February 13, 1954) is a Canadian former professional ice hockey player and National Hockey League head coach.

As a player, Hay played shortly in the International Hockey League before becoming a three-time Memorial Cup-winning coach, predominantly in the Western Hockey League with brief stints in National Hockey League.

Playing career
He was born in Kamloops, British Columbia. After three years of junior in the BCJHL and WCHL, Hay was drafted by the Minnesota North Stars in the 12th round, 193rd overall, of the 1974 NHL Entry Draft, as well as by the Houston Aeros in the 18th round, 230th overall, of the 1974 WHA Entry Draft. However, he never made it to either league as a player, and instead played in the minors during two seasons with the Lansing Lancers, Columbus Owls and Flint Generals of the IHL, and one season with the Philadelphia Firebirds of the NAHL.

Coaching career
Hay began his coaching career in 1986–87 as an assistant coach with his hometown Kamloops Blazers of the WHL. After six years as an assistant, Hay took over the reins as the Blazers head coach in 1992–93 and immediately distinguished himself, subsequently leading his team to two President's Cup titles (1994, 1995) and two Memorial Cup titles (1994, 1995) in three years.

Hay's success in the major junior ranks caught the attention of the NHL, and after spending a year as an assistant coach with the Calgary Flames, Hay was named the head coach of the Phoenix Coyotes for the 1996–97 NHL season, their first year in Phoenix. Despite posting a respectable 38–37–7 record, Hay was let go by the Coyotes after a single season and after one more season in the NHL as an assistant coach with the Mighty Ducks of Anaheim, Hay returned to the WHL.

Immediately upon returning to major junior with the Tri-City Americans in 1998–99, Hay won the Dunc McCallum Memorial Trophy as WHL coach of the year; furthermore, he was prestigiously honoured as the WHL's best coach of all-time by the CHL. This earned him a second chance in the NHL, after two seasons with Tri-City, as the head coach of the Calgary Flames. His second stint in the NHL, however, was even shorter, as he was fired by the Flames just 68 games into the 2000–01 season. Overall, Hay coached 150 games in the NHL, compiling a record of 61–65–20–4.

Moving to the AHL, Hay coached the Utah Grizzlies from 2001 to 2004 before once again returning to the WHL to coach the Vancouver Giants, guiding them to a President's Cup title in 2006 and a Memorial Cup title in 2007. He was nominated once more for the Dunc McCallum Memorial Trophy in 2006, but lost to Willie Desjardins of the Medicine Hat Tigers.

On July 25, 2008, Hay was inducted into the BC Hockey Hall of Fame, along with former NHLers Steve Yzerman and Cliff Ronning. Leading the Giants to within 3 points of the Calgary Hitmen for their first WHL regular season title, he won his second Dunc McCallum Trophy for the 2008–09 season. On August 26, 2010, he agreed to a multi-year extension that was to keep him behind the Giants bench through 2015. However, Hay returned to coach the Kamloops Blazers for the 2014-15 season. And on May 27, 2011, Hay was named head coach of the 2012 Canadian World Junior Hockey Championship team. Hay had previously won gold at the tournament with the Canadians in 1995 in Red Deer, Alta. On April 28, 2013, he coached Canada's U-18 men's team to a Gold Medal against the United States, in Sochi, Russia.

In 2014, he returned to Kamloops Blazers as head coach after 19 seasons away from the team. After four more seasons of coaching, Hay retired in 2018 and became an adviser for the Blazers. In August 2018, Hay was hired by the Portland Winterhawks to be an assistant coach.

Awards and achievements
At the start of the 2006–07 season, his second with the Giants, Hay became the fourteenth head coach in WHL history to win 300 games. Two seasons later, Hay became the ninth coach to win 400 games, defeating the Brandon Wheat Kings 4–3 on November 1, 2008. On January 27, 2018, Hay became the all-time leader in the WHL coaching victories, with his 743rd regular season win.

President's Cup/Ed Chynoweth Cup – 1994, 1995, 2006
Memorial Cup – 1994, 1995, 2007
Dunc McCallum Memorial Trophy (WHL Coach of the Year) – 1999, 2009
British Columbia Hockey Hall of Fame – 2008

Playing statistics

Coaching statistics

References

External links
Don Hay's profile at hockeydb.com
Don Hay's profile at eliteprospects.com

1954 births
Anaheim Ducks coaches
Arizona Coyotes coaches
Calgary Flames coaches
Calgary Centennials players
Houston Aeros draft picks
Kamloops Blazers coaches
Living people
Minnesota North Stars draft picks
New Westminster Bruins players
People from Kamloops
Philadelphia Firebirds (NAHL) players
Tri-City Americans coaches
Vancouver Giants coaches
Canadian ice hockey right wingers
Canadian ice hockey coaches